James William Shea (born 16 June 1991) is an English professional footballer who plays as a goalkeeper for  club Luton Town.

Career

Arsenal
Born in Islington, Greater London, Shea joined Arsenal's youth team in August 2007. In 2009, he won both the Premier Academy League and FA Youth Cup.

Shea joined League One club Southampton on a month-long loan in February 2011 to act as cover for the injured Bartosz Białkowski. However, he was recalled after eight days by Arsenal without making an appearance.

Shea was sent out on loan to League Two club Dagenham & Redbridge for the 2011–12 season. He made his debut as a substitute for Chris Lewington in the match against Macclesfield Town at Moss Rose. Despite getting a yellow card for wasting time, he helped his team to win their first league match of the season by scoreline of 1–0.

He was recalled from his loan by Arsenal on 5 December 2011. On 18 September 2012, he was on the bench because of injuries to Wojciech Szczęsny and Łukasz Fabiański for a UEFA Champions League match against Montpellier HSC. On 30 June 2013, he was released along with nine other young players at Arsenal.

Non-League
After a short spell with Needham Market of Division One North, in October 2013 Shea signed for Isthmian League Premier Division club Harrow Borough, where he played 36 matches, with 32 of these in the league.

AFC Wimbledon
Shea joined League Two club AFC Wimbledon on a free transfer on 4 July 2014.

Shea was Wimbledon's regular goalkeeper during the 2014–15 season and at the start of the 2015–16 season, but was replaced by loan signings when he was injured, and was not able to regain his place. He was on the substitutes' bench for all of the matches of the League Two play-offs of 2016 where Wimbledon reached the final and eventually won 2–0 against Plymouth Argyle at Wembley Stadium thus securing the club's promotion to League One.

Luton Town
On 3 July 2017, Shea joined Luton Town on a one-year contract.

International experience
In August 2010, Shea trained with the England squad at Arsenal's London Colney training ground because of an injury to David Stockdale.

Career statistics

Honours
Arsenal
Premier Academy League: 2008–09
FA Youth Cup: 2008–09

AFC Wimbledon
Football League Two play-offs: 2016

Luton Town
EFL League Two runner-up: 2017–18
EFL League One: 2018–19

Individual
Harrow Borough Player of the Year: 2013–14
EFL League One Golden Glove: 2018–19

References

External links
Profile at the Luton Town F.C. website

1991 births
Living people
Footballers from Islington (district)
English footballers
Association football goalkeepers
Arsenal F.C. players
Southampton F.C. players
Dagenham & Redbridge F.C. players
Needham Market F.C. players
Harrow Borough F.C. players
AFC Wimbledon players
Luton Town F.C. players
English Football League players
Isthmian League players
English people of Irish descent